This is an incomplete list of festivals in Canada. This list includes festivals of diverse types, among them regional festivals, commerce festivals, fairs, food festivals, arts festivals, and recurring festivals on holidays.

Sublists by locale

Province or territory

List of festivals in Alberta (Calgary, Edmonton, Lethbridge)
List of festivals in British Columbia (Vancouver)
List of festivals in Manitoba (Winnipeg)
List of festivals in Ontario (Ottawa, Toronto)
List of festivals in Prince Edward Island
List of festivals in Quebec (Montreal)
List of festivals in Saskatchewan

Atlantic Canada

Territories

City

List of festivals in Calgary 
List of festivals in Edmonton 
List of festivals in Lethbridge 
List of entertainment events in Greater Moncton 
List of festivals and parades in Montreal 
List of festivals in Ottawa 
List of festivals in Toronto 
List of festivals in Vancouver
List of festivals in Winnipeg

Sublists by type

List of film festivals in Canada
List of music festivals in Canada
List of jazz festivals#Canada
List of Canadian blues festivals and venues

Festivals by size

Attendance

 L'International des Feux Loto-Québec (Montreal), 3 million
 Montreal International Jazz Festival (Montreal), 2.5 million
 Winterlude (Ottawa), 1.6 million
 Celebration of Light (Vancouver), 1.6 million
 Just For Laughs (Montreal), 1.5 million
 Quebec City Summer Festival (Québec), 1.5 million
 Ottawa Bluesfest (Ottawa), 1.4 million
 Nuit Blanche Toronto, 1.2 million
 Canadian National Exhibition (Toronto), 1.3 million
 Calgary Stampede, 1.2 million
 Toronto Caribbean Carnival, 1.2 million
 Pride Toronto, 1.3 million
 Montréal En Lumière (Montreal), 0.9 million
 Pacific National Exhibition (Vancouver), 0.9 million
 K-Days (Edmonton), 0.8 million
 Toronto International Film Festival, 0.5 million
 Quebec Winter Carnival (Quebec City), 0.5 million
 Folklorama (Winnipeg), 0.4 million
 Carassauga (Mississauga), 0.3 million
 Festival du Voyageur (Winnipeg), 0.1 million

Economic impact

 Toronto Caribbean Carnival, $470 million
 Calgary Stampede, $172.4 million
 Winterlude (Ottawa-Gatineau), $151 million
 Pacific National Exhibition (Vancouver), $139 million
 Pride Toronto, $136 million
 Toronto International Film Festival, $135 million
 Just For Laughs (Montreal), $80 million
 Canadian National Exhibition (Toronto), $58.6 million
 Celebration of Light (Vancouver), $37 million
 Quebec Winter Carnival, $34 million

Festivals by type

Arts festivals

Children's festivals

Carrousel international du film de Rimouski
Northern Saskatchewan International Children's Festival
Ottawa International Children's Festival
Winnipeg International Children's Festival

Comedy festivals

HubCap Comedy Festival
FunnyFest Calgary Comedy Festival
Halifax Comedy Festival
Just For Laughs, Montreal
Comedia (film)
Zoofest, Montreal
Toronto Sketch Comedy Festival
Winnipeg Comedy Festival
We're Funny That Way!

Cultural festivals

Dance festivals

Canada Dance Festival
Canadian Ballet Festival
Festival TransAmériques
Mondial des Cultures
Thrill the World
Vancouver International Dance Festival

Fairs and exhibitions

Film festivals

Food festivals

Annapolis Valley Apple Blossom Festival, Annapolis Valley, Nova Scotia
Brighton Applefest, Brighton, Ontario
Canada's Largest Ribfest, Burlington, Ontario
Eat! Vancouver, Vancouver, British Columbia
Exploits Valley Salmon Festival, Exploits Valley, Newfoundland and Labrador
Sun and Salsa Festival, Calgary, Alberta
Taste of the Danforth, Toronto, Ontario
A Taste of Edmonton, Edmonton, Alberta

Fringe festivals

Atlantic Fringe Festival
Calgary Fringe Festival
Edmonton International Fringe Festival
Island Fringe Festival
Ottawa Fringe Festival
Saskatoon Fringe Theatre Festival
St-Ambroise Montreal Fringe Festival
Vancouver Fringe Festival
Winnipeg Fringe Theatre Festival

Literary festivals

Banff Mountain Book Festival
Blue Metropolis International Literary Festival
Eden Mills Writers' Festival, Eden Mills, Ontario
The Frye Festival, Moncton, New Brunswick
Vancouver Writers Fest
Winnipeg International Writers Festival
The Word on the Street

Music festivals

See also
Culture of Canada
Tourism in Canada
Public holidays in Canada

References

External links